Samak Jalikula was a Thai politician and former member of House of Representatives (Thailand) from Chaiyaphum Province. He is one of the politicians who fled to the forest after the massacre of protesters at Thammasat University on 6 October 1976.

References

Samak Jalikula
1938 births
Living people